This is a list of people or topics appearing on the cover of Time magazine in the first decade of the 2000s. Time was first published in 1923. As Time became established as one of the United States' leading news magazines, an appearance on the cover of Time became an indicator of notability, fame or notoriety.  Such features were accompanied by articles.

For other decades, see Lists of covers of Time magazine.

2000

2001

2002

2003

2004

2005

2006

2007

2008

2009

References

External links
 Time cover search
 Time The Vault

Time magazine (2000s)
2000s
Cover of Time magazine